The 2018 season was Felda United's 12th competitive season and 1st season in the Malaysia Premier League since relegated in 2017. The season was a success, the club was promoted to the Malaysia Super League after only one-year absence.

Pre-season and friendlies

Competitions

Malaysia Premier League

Malaysia FA Cup

Malaysia Cup

Group stage

Statistics

Appearances and goals

Clean sheets

Transfers

In
1st leg

Out
1st leg

2nd leg

References

Felda United F.C.
Malaysian football clubs 2018 season